Ploegsteert Wood Military Cemetery is a Commonwealth War Graves Commission (CWGC) burial ground for the dead of the First World War located in the Ypres Salient within Ploegsteert Wood on the Western Front in Belgium.

The cemetery grounds were assigned to the United Kingdom in perpetuity by King Albert I of Belgium in recognition of the sacrifices made by the British Empire in the defence and liberation of Belgium during the war.

Foundation
The cemetery was founded by enclosing a number of small cemeteries made by individual regiments. The grounds were established in December 1914 as the "Somerset Light Infantry Cemetery", expanding in April 1915 when the "Bucks Cemetery" was started by the Oxfordshire and Buckinghamshire Light Infantry

A further cemetery was established by the Gloucesters and the Loyal North Lancs regiments in October 1915, named "Canadian Cemetery, Strand" after its 28 Canadian graves and the nearby Strand trench. The cemetery was used by New Zealanders in 1917.

It fell into German hands on 10 April 1918 and remained occupied until 29 September, when the Hundred Days Offensive swept fighting out of the Salient.

The cemetery was designed by W H Cowlishaw.

References

External links
 
 WO1.be
 WW1Cemeteries.com
 

1914 establishments in Belgium
Commonwealth War Graves Commission cemeteries in Belgium